The Western Michigan Broncos men's basketball team represents Western Michigan University in Kalamazoo, Michigan. The school's team competes in the Mid-American Conference (MAC) and are coached by Dwayne Stephens. The team last played in the NCAA Division I men's basketball tournament in 2014.

Postseason

NCAA tournament results
The Broncos have appeared in four NCAA Tournaments. Their combined record is 2–4.

NIT results
The Broncos have appeared in three National Invitational Tournaments (NIT). Their combined record is 2–3.

CBI results
The Broncos have appeared in one College Basketball Invitational (CBI). Their record is 2–1.

CIT results
The Broncos have appeared in the CollegeInsider.com Postseason Tournament (CIT) two times. Their combined record is 1–2.

Broncos in the NBA
 Don Boven, 1950–1953
 Dillard Crocker, 1949–1953
 Paul Griffin, 1977–1983
 Ben Handlogten, 2004–2005
 Reggie Lacefield, 1969
 Walker Russell, 1983–1988
 Shayne Whittington, 2014–2016

All-time win–loss record

Records
Through 2019–20 season

Career leaders

Points

Rebounds

Assists

Field goal percentage (3 made per game)

Free throw percentage (2 made per game)

Three point field goal percentage (1 made per game)

Blocks

Steals

Games played

Single-season leaders

Points

Rebounds

Assists

Field goal percentage (3 made per game)

Free throw percentage (2 made per game)

Three point field goal percentage (1 made per game)

Blocks

Steals

NCAA records
 Ben Handlogten, highest single game field goal percentage, 100% (13–13), January 22, 1996 vs. Toledo
 David Kool, fourth highest single-season free throw percentage by a freshman, 91.7% (99–108), 2006–07
 Sean Wightman, second highest single-season three-point field goal percentage, 63.2% (48–76), 1991–92

References

External links